The MAPILab company is a developer of software for message exchange and team collaboration. MAPILab have produced software for Microsoft Outlook, Microsoft Exchange Server, Microsoft Office SharePoint Server, and Microsoft Excel among other [[Microsoft]] products. The company was founded in 2003. There are 30 employees in the company, all of which have a higher education. Being a Microsoft Gold Certified Partner, the MAPILab company receives the prerelease versions of Microsoft products and updates beforehand and has extended access to technical information and support, which allows to maintain a high quality of products all the time. All products have a trial version and are available for downloading from the company website. The quality of the MAPILab titles was certified by Microsoft and VeriTest. Some of them have received MSD2D People Choice and PC Magazine Best Soft awards. The MAPILab products are placed on the Microsoft Office Online and Windows Catalog websites.

Product lines

 Microsoft Outlook Add-ins - More than 20 various add-ins extend Microsoft Outlook functionality and increase productivity: eliminate duplicates, manage attachments, add other useful features.
 Software for Microsoft Exchange Server - Tools for organizations using Microsoft Exchange Server: Server-side e-mail sorting rules, POP3 connectors, reporting solution;
 Groupware Solutions - Shared folders, folder synchronization and other solutions required to build reliable and low-cost collaboration systems based on Microsoft Outlook.
 MAPILab Statistics for SharePoint - a solution for collecting and analysing data about the usage of site collections of SharePoint product family. The product offers a number of finished reports both for evaluating the common visiting traffic of sites and for reviewing the smallest details such as user sessions and hits.
 Microsoft Excel Add-ons - 7 tools for work automation and productivity improvement: remove duplicated rows and cells; compare spreadsheets; fix broken links and many others.

References

External links
 MAPILab home page
 Native POP3 Connector for Exchange 2000/2003
 Print Agent for Exchange
 MAPILab Disclaimers for Exchange
 Attachment Save for Exchange
 MAPILab POP3 Connector for Exchange 2007/2010

Networking software companies
Companies established in 2003